9971 Ishihara is a stony Flora asteroid from the inner regions of the asteroid belt, approximately  in diameter. It was discovered by Japanese amateur astronomers Kin Endate and Kazuro Watanabe at Kitami Observatory on 16 April 1993, and named after Takahiro Ishihara, president of the astronomical society at Hiroshima.

Orbit and classification 

Ishihara is a member of the Flora family, one of the largest families of stony asteroids in the asteroid belt. It orbits the Sun in the inner main-belt at a distance of 1.9–2.4 AU once every 3 years and 3 months (1,177 days). Its orbit has an eccentricity of 0.12 and an inclination of 3° with respect to the ecliptic.

Naming 

This minor planet was named after Takahiro Ishihara (born 1961), an observer of comets, communicator of astronomy, and former president of the astronomical society at Hiroshima (1987–1997). The  was published by the Minor Planet Center on 6 January 2003.

Physical characteristics

Rotation and poles 

In January 2012, a rotational lightcurve of Ishihara was obtained from photometric observations by astronomers at the Palomar Transient Factory in California. Lightcurve analysis gave a rotation period of  hours with a brightness amplitude of 1.06 in magnitude, which indicates that the body has a non-spheroidal shape.

A 2016-published lightcurve, using modeled photometric data from the Lowell Photometric Database (LPD), gave a concurring period of 6.71574 hours, as well as a spin axis of (42.0°, 76.0°) in ecliptic coordinates (λ, β).

Diameter and albedo 

According to the survey carried out by NASA's Wide-field Infrared Survey Explorer with its subsequent NEOWISE mission, Ishihara measures 4.986 and 5.012 kilometers in diameter and its surface has an albedo of 0.235 and 0.2328, respectively. The Collaborative Asteroid Lightcurve Link assumes an albedo of 0.24 – derived from 8 Flora, a S-type asteroid and the family's largest member and namesake – and calculates a diameter of 3.74 kilometers with an absolute magnitude of 14.3.

References

External links 
 Lightcurve Database Query (LCDB), at www.minorplanet.info
 Dictionary of Minor Planet Names, Google books
 Asteroids and comets rotation curves, CdR – Geneva Observatory, Raoul Behrend
 Discovery Circumstances: Numbered Minor Planets (5001)-(10000) – Minor Planet Center
 
 

009971
Discoveries by Kazuro Watanabe
Discoveries by Kin Endate
Named minor planets
19930416